Edmund Beaufort (c. 1438 – 6 May 1471), styled 4th Duke of Somerset, 6th Earl of Somerset, 3rd Marquess of Dorset, 3rd Earl of Dorset, was an English nobleman, and a military commander during the Wars of the Roses, in which he supported the Lancastrian king Henry VI.

Life

Edmund Beaufort, born about 1438, was the second son of Edmund Beaufort, 2nd Duke of Somerset by his wife Eleanor de Beauchamp, a daughter of Richard Beauchamp, 13th Earl of Warwick and widow of Thomas de Roos, 14th Baron Roos of Hamlake. His elder brother was Henry Beaufort, 3rd Duke of Somerset (26 January 1436 – 15 May 1464).

After the defeat of the Lancastrians in 1461, Edmund was brought up in France with his younger brother John Beaufort, Marquess of Dorset, and on the execution of his elder brother Henry Beaufort, 3rd Duke of Somerset after the Battle of Hexham in 1464, Edmund is said to have succeeded as 4th Duke of Somerset by Lancastrians in February 1471, though his brother's attainder was never reversed, and his titles remained forfeit. In a proclamation dated 27 April 1471 Edmund is spoken of as "Edmund Beaufort, calling himself duke of Somerset".

In October 1470 Beaufort returned from France when King Edward IV was driven from the throne after Richard Neville, 16th Earl of Warwick's defection and alliance with Queen Margaret and the restoration of King Henry VI, who was the first monarch ousted by the family feud, and whom due to occasional insanity she assisted in his duties, Somerset was unenthusiastic over the reconciliation and made little effort to co-operate. In fact his failure to hold London against Edward IV was a decisive moment, leading to the Battle of Barnet (14 April 1471) and the death of Warwick. Some sources say he was present at Barnet, but this is an error.

Fleeing west towards Wales to seek help from Jasper Tudor, but halted by the Yorkist army at the Battle of Tewkesbury (4 May 1471), he commanded the van of the Lancastrian army at the battle. His position was almost unassailable, but under the pressure of Edward's Flemish handgunners, once the battle began Beaufort moved down from the heights and attacked Edward IV's right flank. He was assailed by both the king and Richard, Duke of Gloucester, and was soon put to flight, his conduct having practically decided the battle in favour of the Yorkists.

After the defeat, Somerset and other Lancastrian leaders took refuge in Tewkesbury Abbey, but they were forced from sanctuary two days later. They were tried and executed immediately, at the Cross in the centre of Tewkesbury, on Monday 6 May 1471. He was buried on the south side of Tewkesbury Abbey, under an arch. His younger brother John had been killed during the battle, and as both died unmarried, "the house of Beaufort and all the honours to which they were entitled became extinct".

The murder shortly thereafter of Henry VI left Edmund's 1st cousin, Lady Margaret Beaufort, and her son, Henry Tudor, as the senior representatives of the House of Lancaster.

Ancestry

Notes

References
 

Attribution
  Endnotes:
 Arrivall of Edward IV and Warkworth's Chron. (Camden Soc.)
 Hall's Chronicle
 Polydore Vergil
 Cal. Patent Polls
 Stubbs's Const. Hist. iii. 208, 210
 Ramsay's Lancaster and York, ii. 380-2
 Doyle's Official Baronage
 G. E. Cokayne's Complete Peerage
 Notes and Queries, 4th ser. xii. 29, 276.

1430s births
1471 deaths
Edmund Beaufort, 4th Duke of Somerset
203
People of the Wars of the Roses
People executed under the Yorkists
Executed English people
Burials at Tewkesbury Abbey